Jesper Tolinsson (born 28 February 2003) is a Swedish professional footballer who plays for Belgian club Lommel as a centre back.

References

External links 
 

Swedish footballers
Sweden youth international footballers
Allsvenskan players
2003 births
Living people
IFK Göteborg players
Association football defenders
Footballers from Gothenburg